Swenson is a surname. Notable people with the surname include:

Bob Swenson, professional football player
Cal Swenson, Canadian ice hockey player
Chuck Swenson, American college basketball coach
Doug Swenson (1945-2009), American politician, lawyer, and judge
Earl Swensson (born c. 1931), American architect
Elmer Swenson, pioneering grape breeder
Erick Swenson, American artist
Gloria Josephine Swenson, birth name of silent film actress Gloria Swanson
Inga Swenson, American actress
Kari Swenson, biathlete
Karl Swenson (1908–1978), American actor
Kaycee Nicole Swenson, fictitious persona, well-known case of Münchausen by Internet from 1999 to 2001.
Ken Swenson, American middle distance runner
Lyman Knute Swenson, U.S. Naval officer killed in World War II
Mary Ann Swenson, American, Methodist bishop
May Swenson, American poet and playwright
Pete Swenson, American ski mountaineer
Rick Swenson, professional dog musher
Robert Swenson, aka Jeep Swenson, professional wrestler
Ruth Ann Swenson, American soprano
Swante M. Swenson,  founder of SMS ranches, first Swedish immigrant in Texas
William D. Swenson, United States Army Officer, Recipient of the Medal of Honor